Chanalu or Chenalu may refer to:
 Chenalu, Zarand